Glory is an instrumental album by Christian recording artist Michael W. Smith. Released in November 2011, the album is Smith's second instrumental album following Freedom in 2000. The album was recorded with a 65-piece orchestra at 
AIR Studios Lyndhurst Hall in London and Wildwood Recording Studio in Nashville. The music was arranged by Smith's longtime friend David Hamilton, and produced by Smith himself.

Track listing

Personnel 
 Michael W. Smith – composer, grand piano, additional programming
 David Hamilton – programming, orchestral arrangements and conductor
 Mark Baldwin – guitars
 Mark Hammond – percussion programming
 Jeff Bailey – trumpet, piccolo trumpet
 Sophie Harris – cello
 Gabrielle Lester – concertmaster, violin
 Paul Spong – contractor
 The London Symphonica – orchestra

Production 
 Produced by Michael W. Smith and David Hamilton
 Executive Producers – Michael W. Smith, Chaz Corzine and Greg Ham.
 Orchestra recorded by Geoff Foster at AIR Studios (Lyndhurst Hall, London, England), assisted by Chris Barrett.
 Piano recorded by Brendan Harkin at Wildwood Recording (Nashville, TN), assisted by Taemin Daniel Choi.
 Editing by David Hamilton at Studiowave (Brentwood, TN).
 Mixed by Rob Burrell at emotionmix studios.
 Mastered by Hank Williams at MasterMix (Nashville, TN).
 Ken Johnson – production manager
 Ric Domenico – music preparation
 David Shipps – music preparation
 Tim Parker – art direction, design
 Russ Harrington – photography
 Robin Geary – hair stylist, makeup

Reception

Dawno's Music and Book Reviews on New Release Tuesday described Glory as "worth repeated listens" and that the album is "contemplative, majestic, somber, romantic, joyful, and playful." Lindsay Williams from watchgmctv.com wrote that Glory was "as sentimental as it is patriotic and boasts a collection of instrumental soundscapes that honor family, God and country."

Chart performance

References

Michael W. Smith albums
2011 albums
Instrumental albums
Reunion Records albums
Albums recorded at AIR Studios